Arys may refer to:

People
 Evelyn Arys (born 1990), Belgian racing cyclist

Places 
 Arys, Kazakhstan
 Arys (lake), Kazakhstan
 Arys (river), Kazakhstan
 Orzysz (German or Lithuanian: Arys), Poland
 Orzysz (lake), in Poland

See also
 Aris (disambiguation)